Petrovsky District may refer to:
Petrovsky District, Russia, name of several districts in Russia
Petrovsky District, Donetsk, a city district of Donetsk, Ukraine
Petrove Raion, a former district of Kirovohrad Oblast, Ukraine